Marilia Andrés Casares (born 17 December 1974 in Cuenca) is a Spanish singer-songwriter.

Since she was a child, she showed a great interest in music and in the last course of high-school, she met Marta Botía, with whom she created the successful group Ella baila sola. They performed in several parks in Madrid until they recorded their first album in 1996. They split up in 2001. However, in 2021, the duo (original members Marta y Marilia) reunited to perform a few live concerts in celebration of their 25th anniversary.

Discography

With Ella Bala Sola 

 Ella Baila Sola (1996)
 EBS (1998)
 Marta y Marilia (2000)
 Grandes Éxitos (2001)
 Colección Definitiva 25 Aniversario (2021)

Solo albums 

 Subir una montaña (2012)
 Infinito (2017)

Singles 
 Mi Dragon (2019)
 Me Voy (2019)
 Volver a los Diecisiete (2018)
 Claro Que Hace Falta Hablar (2017)
 Si No Es un Si Es un No (2017)
 Infinito (2017)
 Superviviente (2017)
 Entra (2017)
 Subir una Montana (2012)
 Una Luz (2017)
 Senoras (2012)
 Marilyn y Superman (2012)
 Casi Me Rindo (2012)

References 

1974 births
Living people
People from Cuenca, Spain
Singers from Castilla–La Mancha
21st-century Spanish singers
21st-century Spanish women singers